Cascade Creek may refer to:

 Cascade Creek (Grand Teton National Park), Wyoming
 Cascade Creek (San Anselmo Creek), California
 Cascade Creek (South Dakota)
 Cascade Creek, in British Columbia's Cascade Falls Regional Park 
 Cascade Creek, a tributary to Fountain Creek in Colorado

See also
 Cascade River (disambiguation)
 Cascade Falls (disambiguation)
 Cascade Lake (disambiguation)